In June 1991, representatives of Bosnian Muslims (Party of Democratic Action, SDA) and Bosnian Serbs (Serb Democratic Party, SDS) met to discuss the future status of SR Bosnia and Herzegovina during the Yugoslav crisis. 

On behalf of SDA president Alija Izetbegović, Adil Zulfikarpašić and Muhamed Filipović met with SDS president Radovan Karadžić, Nikola Koljević and Momčilo Krajišnik. The two sides reached an agreement that Bosnia and Herzegovina was to remain sovereign and undivided, remaining in a Yugoslav confederation with Serbia and Montenegro. The Muslim Bosniak-inhabited area of Sandžak in SR Serbia was to become autonomous, while SAO Krajina and SAO Bosanska Krajina were to abandon their unification plan. Zulfikarpašić received the consent of Serbian President Slobodan Milošević, who also promised 60% of Sandžak to Bosnia and Herzegovina. Izetbegović, who initially supported it, later abandoned the agreement.

The inability to find a solution diplomatically eventually led to the outbreak of the Bosnian War some 10 months later. Following the signing of the Dayton Agreement which ended the war, Bosnia and Herzegovina became an internationally recognized independent federation with several entities, while Serbia and Montenegro formed a rump FR Yugoslavia which was heavily sanctioned and embargoed by the international community.

Annotations

See also
Partition of Bosnia and Herzegovina
Peace plans proposed before and during the Bosnian War

References

Sources

External links

Text of the Agreement (in Serbocroat)

1991 in politics
1991 in Bosnia and Herzegovina
1991 in Serbia
Political history of Bosnia and Herzegovina
Party of Democratic Action
Serb Democratic Party (Bosnia and Herzegovina)
Partition (politics)
June 1991 events in Europe